Toshihiro Shibutani (born August 30, 1962) is a retired long-distance runner from Japan, who won the 1988 edition of the Fukuoka Marathon, clocking 2:11:04 on December 4, 1988.

Achievements
All results regarding marathon, unless stated otherwise

References
 1988 Year Ranking

1962 births
Living people
Place of birth missing (living people)
Japanese male long-distance runners
Japanese male marathon runners
Japan Championships in Athletics winners
Academic staff of Biwako Seikei Sport College